Miguel Ángel Fornés (born 6 September 1993) is a Spanish male volleyball player. He is part of the Spain men's national volleyball team. On club level he plays for Knack Randstad Roeselare.

References

External links
Profile at FIVB.org

1993 births
Living people
Spanish men's volleyball players
Sportspeople from Palma de Mallorca
Spanish expatriates in Belgium
Spanish expatriate sportspeople in France
Expatriate volleyball players in Belgium
Expatriate volleyball players in France
Competitors at the 2018 Mediterranean Games
Mediterranean Games silver medalists for Spain
Mediterranean Games medalists in volleyball
21st-century Spanish people